Anerastia metallactis is a species of snout moth in the genus Anerastia. It was described by Edward Meyrick in 1887. It is found in Australia.

References

Moths described in 1887
Anerastiini
Moths of Australia